Prince Albert Transit provides local city bus service in the City of Prince Albert, Saskatchewan, Canada.

Services
There are six scheduled bus routes with the downtown transfer point located at Central Avenue and 14th Street. Like many small transit systems all the routes run on one way loops, to give better coverage of the city with a limited number of vehicles. There is no transit service to the communities, industrial areas and airport on the north side of the North Saskatchewan River.

Hours of operation are on Monday to Friday from 6:45 am to 7:15 pm and on Saturdays from 9:45 am to 5:15 pm. There is no service on Sundays or statutory holidays.

All bus routes operate on 30 minute frequencies (even on Saturdays), with all routes departing from the transfer station on the :15s and :45s.

Scheduled routes
Prince Albert Transit operates a total of 6 routes, with 5 operating all day and one (Rush Hour Service) operating only between 6:45am to 9:45am and 2:45pm to 6:45pm.

1 - Rush Hour Service
2 - All Day Express
3 - West Hill
4 - East Hill
5 - East Flat
6 - West Flat

Bus fleet
Prince Albert Transit operates a fleet of 10 buses, consisting of New Flyer D40LFR, Starcraft Bus AllStar, and Grande West Vicinity 35'

See also

 Public transport in Canada

References

External links
Prince Albert Transit Route Map

Transit agencies in Saskatchewan
Transport in Prince Albert, Saskatchewan